The 2022 UAE Tour was a road cycling stage race that took place between 20 and 26 February 2022 in the United Arab Emirates. It was the fourth edition of the UAE Tour and the opening race of the 2022 UCI World Tour.

Teams 
All but one of the 18 UCI WorldTeams, and three UCI ProTeams, make up the 20 teams that are participating in the race. , the only UCI WorldTeam to not be participating in the race, declined their invitation, citing a full schedule.  and  received automatic invitations as the best performing UCI ProTeams in the 2021 season, but only the former accepted their invitation.

In total, 125 riders started the race, of which 122 finished.

UCI WorldTeams

 
 
 
 
 
 
 
 
 
 
 
 
 
 
 
 
 

UCI ProTeams

Route

Stages

Stage 1 
20 February 2022 — Madinat Zayed to Madinat Zayed,

Stage 2 
21 February 2022 – Al Hudayriat Island to Abu Dhabi Breakwater,

Stage 3 
22 February 2022 – Ajman (Al Zorah),  (ITT)

Stage 4 
23 February 2022 – Fujairah Fort to Jebel Jais,

Stage 5 
24 February 2022 – Ras Al Khaimah Corniche to Al Marjan Island,

Stage 6 
25 February 2022 – Expo 2020 Dubai to Expo 2020 Dubai,

Stage 7 
26 February 2022 – Al Ain (Al Jahili Fort) to Jebel Hafeet,

Classification leadership table 

 On stage 2, Sam Bennett, who was third in the points classification, wore the green jersey, because first-placed Jasper Philipsen wore the red jersey as the leader of the general classification and second-placed Dmitry Strakhov wore the black jersey as the leader of the sprints classification. For the same reason, Mark Cavendish wore the green jersey on stage 3.
 On stages 2 and 3, Xandres Vervloesem, who was second in the young rider classification, wore the white jersey, because first-placed Jasper Philipsen wore the red jersey as the leader of the general classification.
 On stage 4, Tadej Pogačar, who was second in the young rider classification, wore the white jersey, because first-placed Stefan Bissegger wore the red jersey as the leader of the general classification.
 On stages 5–7, João Almeida, who was second in the young rider classification, wore the white jersey, because first-placed Tadej Pogačar wore the red jersey as the leader of the general classification.

Final classification standings

General classification

Points classification

Sprints classification

Young rider classification

Team classification

References

Sources

External links 
 

2022
UAE Tour
UAE Tour
UAE Tour